The 2013 Ethias Trophy was a professional tennis tournament played on hard courts. It was the ninth edition of the tournament which was part of the 2013 ATP Challenger Tour. It took place in Mons, Belgium between 30 September and 6 October 2013.

Singles main-draw entrants

Seeds

 1 Rankings are as of September 23, 2013.

Other entrants
The following players received wildcards into the singles main draw:
  Ruben Bemelmans
  Steve Darcis
  Germain Gigounon
  Olivier Rochus

The following players received entry as a special exempt into the singles main draw:
  Pierre-Hugues Herbert
  Jaroslav Pospíšil

The following players received entry as an alternate into the singles main draw:
  Illya Marchenko

The following players used protected ranking to gain entry into the singles main draw:
  Andreas Beck

The following players received entry from the qualifying draw:
  Matthias Bachinger
  Maxime Authom
  Lorenzo Giustino
  Norbert Gombos

Champions

Singles

 Radek Štěpánek def.  Igor Sijsling 6–3, 7–5

Doubles

 Jesse Huta Galung /  Igor Sijsling def.  Eric Butorac /  Raven Klaasen 4–6, 7–6(7–2), [10–7]

External links
Official Website

 
Ethias Trophy
Ethias Trophy
Ethias Trophy
Ethias Trophy